Hepialiscus nepalensis is a moth of the family Hepialidae. It is found in Nepal, India and China (Xizang).

References

Moths described in 1856
Hepialidae
Moths of Asia